Dubina or Dubyna (Cyrillic: Дубина) may refer to
Dubina (surname)
 Dubina, Texas, an unincorporated community in the United States
Dubyna, Skole Raion, a village in Skole Raion, Lviv Oblast, Western Ukraine
Dubyna, Brody Raion, a village in Brodivskyi Raion, Lviv Oblast, western Ukraine